Ida Mary Barry Ryan (December 21, 1854 – October 17, 1917) was an American philanthropist.

Early life
Ida Mary Barry was born in Baltimore, Maryland, December 21, 1854. Her father, Captain John Smith Barry (1829–1872), was a prominent merchant and the owner of a line of vessels plying between Baltimore and the West Indies. Captain Barry was the son of Robert Barry, who married Amelia, daughter of Col. Dennis Ramsay, of Alexandria, Virginia, a colonel in the Revolutionary Army. Her mother was Rosalie (Hillard) Barry (1832–1905). Ida had ten siblings: Benjamin Hillard Barry (1849–1850), Robert Barry (1851–1854), John S. Barry (1853–1854), Anna Hillard Barry (1857–1857), Rosalie C Barry (1859–?), John S. Barry (1861–1862), Amelia R. Barry (1862–1863), Henry A. Barry (1863–1892), J. Bardwell Barry (1866–1867), and Joseph Allen Barry (1869–1939).

Career
On November 25, 1873, she married Thomas Fortune Ryan. She and her husband were generous contributors to many of the charitable institutions and philanthropic work of the church, especially in Virginia. They built the Sacred Heart Church, Washington Ward, and Sacred Heart Cathedral School at Richmond; and the church and convent at Falls Church, Virginia. They contributed to churches at Hot Springs, Virginia, Harrisburg, Virginia, and Keyser, West Virginia; the chapel at Suffern, New York, where their summer home was located, and together gave Ryan Hall and a wing to Georgetown University, Georgetown, Washington, D.C. She built a hospital annex for Sisters of Charity in New York City.

Personal life and legacy

Mr. and Mrs. Ryan had eight children: John Barry Ryan Sr. (1874–1942), Thomas Fortune Ryan Jr. (1876–1882), William Keane Ryan (1878–1906), Allan Aloysius Ryan Sr. (1880–1940), Clendenin James Ryan Sr. (1882–1939), Mary Loretta Ryan (1884–1889), James Joseph Ryan (1890–1920), Mary Ryan (1892–?).

In 1915, Mr. and Mrs. Ryan visited California.

Ida Mary Barry Ryan died from heart disease after being taken suddenly ill at her country home at Suffern, October 17, 1917. Interment was at St. Andrew-on-Hudson.

Awards and honors
She was decorated with the Cross of St. Gregory and made a Countess by Pope Pius X for her philanthropic work.

References

1854 births
1917 deaths
Dames Grand Cross of the Order of St Gregory the Great
20th-century American philanthropists
Catholics from Maryland
People from Baltimore